Deathrow is thrash metal group from Düsseldorf, Germany. Founded in 1984 as Samhain, they notably released three albums on Noise Records.

Discography
 Satan's Gift (1986, Combat Records), renamed and re-released as Riders of Doom (Noise Records)
 Raging Steel (1987, Noise Records)
 Deception Ignored (1989, Noise Records)
 Life Beyond (1992, West Virginia Records)

References

External links
 

German thrash metal musical groups
Musical groups established in 1984
Musical groups disestablished in 1994
Culture in Düsseldorf
Combat Records artists
Noise Records artists